Scott Fulton (born 7 March 1973) is an Australian former rugby league footballer and the son of the rugby league Immortal Bob Fulton.

Fulton made his first-grade debut seven days after his 20th birthday, starting at hooker for the Manly Warringah Sea Eagles in the opening round of the 1993 NSWRL season, becoming the 388th Manly player to represent the club.

After seven seasons and only 49 games in the NSWRL, he played his final game in Round 7 of the 1999 season, against Balmain. This was also the last game his father coached the team.  When his Bob Fulton quit his post, Scott was not selected for the firsts or reserves team, and he never played another game with Manly.
He later played for the Coonamble Bears in the Castlereagh Cup.

His brother Brett Fulton also played first-grade for Manly, similarly spending the entirety of his brief career under the coaching of their father. Scott's son Zac Fulton plays for Manly.

References

1973 births
Living people
Rugby league players from Sydney
Australian people of English descent
Australian rugby league players
Manly Warringah Sea Eagles players
Rugby league hookers
Place of birth missing (living people)